Ernest Michael Coles (12 August 1936 – 26 April 2005) was an English actor. He appeared in a number British television series and films during the 1960s and 1970s including No Hiding Place, Dr. Who and the Daleks, The Troubleshooters, The Saint, The Baron, The Avengers, Department S and Z-Cars. His film roles included Inspector Murray in Dracula A.D. 1972 (1972) and The Satanic Rites of Dracula (1973), three of the Edgar Wallace films of the early sixties (Man Detained, Solo for Sparrow and Never Mention Murder), as well as the film version of The Sweeney (1977).

Filmography

References

External links

1936 births
2005 deaths
English male stage actors
English male film actors
English male television actors